Thabo Cele (born 15 January 1997) is a South African soccer player who plays as a midfielder for Ekstraklasa club Radomiak Radom.

Career
Cele was born in KwaMashu.

In 2016, Cele signed for Portuguese third division side Real S.C. from the KZN Academy in South Africa.

In 2017, he signed for S.L. Benfica, Portugal's most successful club, before returning to Real S.C. on loan.

In 2018, he signed for Cova da Piedade in the Portuguese second division.

On 12 October 2021, after training with the team since September, he joined Polish side Radomiak Radom on a two-year deal.

References

External links
 
 

1997 births
Living people
South African soccer players
Association football midfielders
C.D. Cova da Piedade players
Real S.C. players
S.L. Benfica footballers
Radomiak Radom players
Ekstraklasa players
South African expatriate soccer players
Expatriate footballers in Poland
Footballers at the 2020 Summer Olympics
Olympic soccer players of South Africa